The prime minister of Seychelles was an executive position in the government of the Seychelles from 1970 until 1977.

Prime ministers of Seychelles (1970–1977)

Notes

Timeline

See also
Seychelles
Politics of Seychelles
List of colonial governors of Seychelles
List of presidents of Seychelles
Vice-President of Seychelles
Lists of office-holders

External links
World Statesmen – Seychelles

Seychelles

Prime ministers
1970 establishments in Seychelles
1977 disestablishments in Seychelles